McLaren Lake Regional Park is located in the southwest part of the Province of Saskatchewan, near the villages of Richmound and Golden Prairie, SK and Schuler, AB.  The lake is approximately 2 km long and 0.5 km wide with the park area located on the east end.  The lake has been stocked with rainbow trout over the last number of years and five wind powered aeration systems have been installed to oxygenate the lake during the winter months.  The regional park, open from May 1 to September 15, has powered and unpowered campsites, firepits, sewage disposal, a concession stand, camp kitchen, playground, showers, flush toilets, ball diamond, horseshoe pits, dock and beach area.

References

External links 
 https://web.archive.org/web/20100423033948/http://www.richmound.ca/mclarenlake.html

Regional parks of Canada
Parks in Saskatchewan